The Vauxhall 20 h.p. chassis code A, was a four-cylinder medium-sized car manufactured by Vauxhall from 1908 to 1914 with one more built in 1920. It was the first production Vauxhall designed by Laurence Pomeroy. It became a highly acclaimed 3 litre of its day and at Brooklands on 26 October 1910 it became the first 20 hp car to exceed .

Genesis
Laurence Pomeroy had joined Vauxhall in 1907 as an assistant draughtsman at the age of twenty-two. He first made his mark at the 1908 RAC and Scottish Reliability Trial, held in June of that year. His first prototype, a development of Vauxhall's 12-16 and named Y1, had outstanding success showing excellent hill climbing ability with an aggregate of 37 seconds less time in the hill climbs than any other car in its class and unparalleled speeds around the Brooklands circuit. It went on to win class E of the Trial. That design was put into production in 1908 as Vauxhall's 20 hp offering. Four distinct variations were produced between 27 October 1908 and the end of production in 1914. One last car was put together in 1920.

The four distinct versions - A09, A11, A12 and 16-20

Engine
The 3-litre side-valve monobloc engine was provided with forced lubrication . The camshaft and magneto were gear-driven until the 16-20 when it was changed to chain drive.

Reviewing the exhibits at the North of England Motor Show at the beginning of 1912 the Manchester Guardian reported that the 20 h.p. engine had been given for 1912 new light connecting rods of very high grade steel and pistons reduced in weight to give smooth running.

Gearbox
The A09 and A11 were supplied with a four-speed gearbox though some of the earliest cars retained the three-speed gearboxes of the 12-16 and at least 70 of the first cars also retained the sheet copper sump of their predecessor. There was a major revision of the chassis for the A12 and for the 16-20 both engine and chassis underwent major redesign.

Range for 1913
In November 1912 immediately before the opening of the Olympia Show Vauxhall announced their full range for 1913 would be four chassis:
 16-20 hp 4-cylinder 90 x 120 mm chassis £395
 25 hp 4-cylinder 95 x 140 mm chassis £465 (replaces the 20 hp)
 25 hp Prince Henry chassis £495
 35 hp six-cylinder 95 x 120 mm chassis £625
all were to have 4-speed gearboxes

See the table below for more information.

Capable of up to  the A-Type Vauxhall was one of the most acclaimed 3-litre cars of its day, achieving many records for out-right speed and high speed endurance, within the 21 hp limit, as well as having had some parental involvement in the conception of both the Prince Henry and the 30-98 Vauxhalls.

Fewer than two dozen survive today out of the 950 produced.

Basic chassis changes during production

Engine changes during production

Surviving cars

References

A-Type
1910s cars
1900s cars